The 2017 Varsity Shield was the 2017 edition of the Varsity Shield, an annual second-tier inter-university rugby union competition featuring university sides in South Africa. The tournament – known as the FNB Varsity Shield presented by Steinhoff International for sponsorship reasons – was the seventh season of the Varsity Shield and was contested from 9 February to 10 April 2017.

Competition rules and information

There were seven participating universities in the 2017 Varsity Shield. These teams played each other once over the course of the season, either home or away.

Teams received four points for a win and two points for a draw. Bonus points were awarded to teams that scored four or more tries in a game, as well as to teams that lost a match by seven points or less. Teams were ranked by log points, then points difference (points scored less points conceded).

The top four teams qualified for the title play-offs. In the semi-finals, the team that finished first had home advantage against the team that received fourth, while the team that finished second had home advantage against the team that finished third. The winners of these semi-finals played each other in the final, at the home venue of the higher-placed team.

Teams

The following teams took part in the 2017 Varsity Shield competition:

Standings

The final standings for the 2017 Varsity Shield were:

Round-by-round

The table below shows each team's progression throughout the season. For each round, their cumulative points total is shown with the overall log position in brackets:

Matches

The following matches were played in the 2017 Varsity Shield:

Round one

Round two

Round three

Round four

Round five

Round six

Round seven

Semi-finals

Final

See also

 Varsity Cup
 2017 Varsity Rugby
 2017 Varsity Cup
 2017 Gold Cup

Notes

References

External links
 
 

2017
2017 in South African rugby union
2017 rugby union tournaments for clubs